Donje Novo Selo is a village in the municipality of Nijemci in Vukovar-Syrmia County, Croatia. The population is 498 (census 2011).

References

Populated places in Vukovar-Syrmia County
Populated places in Syrmia